Barringtonia curranii grows as a tree up to  tall, with a trunk diameter of up to . The bark is grey, greyish green or dark brown. Habitat is forest from sea level to  altitude. 

B. curranii is found in Borneo and Palawan.

References

curranii
Trees of Borneo
Trees of the Philippines
Flora of Palawan
Plants described in 1906